Murray Edward Keogan (born January 14, 1950) is a Canadian retired professional ice hockey forward.  He would play 124 games in the World Hockey Association with the Phoenix Roadrunners and Calgary Cowboys.

Career statistics

Awards and honours

External links
 

1950 births
Living people
Anglophone Quebec people
Calgary Cowboys players
Canadian ice hockey forwards
Denver Spurs (WHL) players
Kansas City Blades players
Ice hockey people from Quebec City
Minnesota Duluth Bulldogs men's ice hockey players
Phoenix Roadrunners (WHA) players
Phoenix Roadrunners (WHL) players
St. Louis Blues draft picks
Springfield Indians players
Canadian expatriate ice hockey players in the United States
AHCA Division I men's ice hockey All-Americans